Chris Allen (born 1966) is a British sociologist and associate professor at the Centre for Hate Studies at the University of Leicester. He was named by the Deutsche Welle as an expert on the topic of contemporary Islamophobia.

Research into Islamophobia 
Shortly after the events of 9/11 he was commissioned by the European Monitoring Centre on Racism and Xenophobia to co-author its "Summary report on Islamophobia in the EU after 11 September 2001" with Jorgen S. Nielsen. Published in May 2002, the report concluded that "a greater receptivity towards anti-Muslim and other xenophobic ideas and sentiments has, and may well continue, to become more tolerated". At the same time, Allen apparently acknowledged that "there were very few serious [anti-Muslim] attacks" and that Islamophobia "manifested itself in quite basic and low-level ways." However, Allen has stated that after the report was published there was a "concerted effort by some to dismiss this data because the number of 'high level' incidents - violent assaults, murder, firebombing of mosques etc - were (thankfully) low." He also stated that the focus in the number of Islamophobic incidents or severity of them minimizes the fact that the hate, prejudice, and discrimination that Muslims face negatively affect them and their lives.

In 2012, he was asked to be on the board of "a cross-government working group to tackle anti-Muslim hatred". He later resigned from the group.

Bibliography 
 Islamophobia (2010)

References

External links 
Chris Allen's personal website

Living people
Academics of the University of Birmingham
Islam in Europe
1966 births
Scholars of Islamophobia